The Port Curtis colonial by-election, 1861 was a by-election held on 15 October 1861 in the electoral district of Port Curtis for the Queensland Legislative Assembly.

History
On 3 September 1861, Charles Fitzsimmons, the member for Port Curtis, resigned. Alfred Sandeman won the resulting by-election on 15 October 1861.

See also
 Members of the Queensland Legislative Assembly, 1860–1863

References

1861 elections in Australia
Queensland state by-elections
1860s in Queensland
October 1861 events